Eulithidium phasianella is a species of small sea snail with calcareous opercula, a marine gastropod mollusk in the family Phasianellidae, the pheasant snails.

Description
The shell grows to a height of 4 mm.

Distribution
This species occurs in the Pacific Ocean from Nicaragua to Peru, but not off Galapagos Islands.

References

External links
 To Biodiversity Heritage Library (1 publication)
 To World Register of Marine Species
 

Phasianellidae
Gastropods described in 1849